Melipotis albiterminalis is a species of moth in the family Erebidae. It is found in Peru.

References

Moths described in 1944
Melipotis
Moths of South America
Taxa named by Max Wilhelm Karl Draudt